Nowa Wieś Lęborska is a PKP railway station in Nowa Wieś Lęborska (Pomeranian Voivodeship), Poland.

Lines crossing the station

References 
Nowa Wieś Lęborska article at Polish Stations Database, URL accessed at 18 March 2006

Railway stations in Pomeranian Voivodeship
Lębork County